Kazuya Sato (born 6 April 1995) is a Japanese judoka.

She won a medal at the 2021 World Judo Championships.

References

External links
 

1995 births
Living people
Japanese female judoka
World judo champions
21st-century Japanese women